Federico Hernández de León (March 4, 1883 – 1959) was a Guatemalan writer, historian and journalist. He graduated from the Instituto Nacional Central para Varones of Guatemala, with a high school diploma in 1900. Active politically, was arrested during the last few years of the government of president Manuel Estrada Cabrera, being held in the Central Penitentiary of Guatemala until the president was deposed on April 14, 1920. After his release, he went straight to take over the Diario de Centro América semi-official newspaper of Guatemala at the time. Later, he directed Nuestro Diario along with Carlos Bauer Aviles.

Biography 

During his more than six years of imprisonment in the Central Penitentiary, Hernández de León suffered many indignities that left him on the brink of death; but his friend, the labor leader Silverio Ortiz advocated for him to the minister plenipotentiary of the United States, showing Hernández de León's bloody clothes.

After the fall of Estrada Cabrera in 1920, he was released and returned to journalism; he was in the legislature and in the National Congress in the 1920s and 1930s. On December 12, 1930, there was a lot of turmoil in the Guatemalan government after general Lázaro Chacón suffered a stroke that forced him to resign from office. Hernández de León was a first hand witness as he was in Congress and he was also de Director of newspaper Nuestro Diario.
In December 1930 the following events occurred in a rapid succession:
 On December 12, General Chacón suffers a stroke that forces him to resign.
 General Mauro de León, first designated successor to the Presidency apparently resigns.
 Lawyer and cabinet member Baudilio Palma, second designated successor, is appointed interim President.
 On December 16, 1930, a coup de' etat led by general Manuel María Orellana Contreras forces Palma to resign after a short battle inside the Presidential Palace. During the fight, that lasted no more than an hour, both Palma and Mauro de León died. The Liberal Progresista party places general Roderico Anzueto in the key position of Chief of Police.
 On January 2, 1931 José María Reina Andrade is appointed interim President, after the foreign nations representatives refuse to deal with Orellana Contreras and calls for presidential elections.
 On February 7, 1931, general Jorge Ubico Castañeda wins the elections and is sworn as president. The Liberal Party joined with the Progressives to nominate Ubico as Andrade's successor, and although he was the only candidate on the ballot, he received 305,841 votes in February 1931. In his inaugural address, he pledged a "march toward civilization". Once in office, he began a campaign of efficiency that included assuming dictatorial power.

Affiliations 
 Member of the Guatemalan Academy, corresponding to the Royal Spanish Academy of Language
 Member of the Liberal Progressive Party of Guatemala.

Legacy 
When he was the Director of Nuestro Diario he hired a very young Clemente Marroquín Rojas as a columnist. Eventually Marroquín Rojas even took charge of the newspaper and wrote Hernández's column "Efemérides" while Hernández was out on commission.

Notes

References

Bibliography

  
  
  
 
  
 
  
  
  
 
 
  

1883 births
1959 deaths
People from Quetzaltenango
20th-century Guatemalan historians
Guatemalan male writers
Guatemalan journalists
Male journalists
Prisoners and detainees of Guatemala
20th-century male writers
20th-century journalists